The foreign policy of Solomon Islands  was described by the Solomon Islands government as a "look north" policy, aimed as strengthening diplomatic and economic relations with Asian countries for development purposes.

Diplomatic Representation

Countries with diplomatic missions in Solomon Islands are Australia, Japan, New Zealand, Papua New Guinea, South Korea and the United Kingdom. The U.S. ambassador resident in Port Moresby, Papua New Guinea is also accredited to Solomon Islands. Canada, France, Germany, South Korea, Sweden and Malaysia have Honorary Consuls.

Solomon Islands has diplomatic missions in Canberra, Papua New Guinea, at the United Nations in New York, where the ambassador there is also accredited as its ambassador to the United States of America, UNESCO in Paris and high commissioner to Canada and at the European Commission in Brussels where the representative is also accredited as High Commissioner to the UK.

Diplomatic relations 

List of countries with Solomon Islands have diplomatic relations with:

Bilateral relations

Current

Former bilateral relations

Main multilateral involvement

Solomon Islands is a member of the United Nations, UNESCO, the Commonwealth, South Pacific Commission, Pacific Islands Forum, International Monetary Fund, and the European Economic Community/African, Caribbean, Pacific Group (EEC/ACP)/(Lome Convention).

International organisation participation 

ACP, AsDB, ESCAP, FAO, Commonwealth of Nations, G-77, IBRD, ICAO, ICRM, IDA, IFAD, IFC, IFRCS, ILO, IMF, IMO, Intelsat (nonsignatory user), IOC, ITU, PIF, Sparteca, SPC, United Nations, UNCTAD, UNESCO, UPU, WFTU, WHO, WMO, WTrO

See also
 British High Commissioner to Solomon Islands
 List of ambassadors of the Solomon Islands to China
 List of ambassadors of the Solomon Islands to Taiwan
 List of High Commissioners of the United Kingdom to Solomon Islands
 List of ambassadors of the Solomon Islands to the United States
 List of diplomatic missions in Solomon Islands
 List of diplomatic missions of Solomon Islands
 Minister of Foreign Affairs (Solomon Islands)

References

External links
Solomon Islands Establish Diplomatic Relations with Switzerland
"Foreign Policy Should be Driven by Rational Dialogue", Solomon Times, 22 April 2008

 
Solomon Islands and the Commonwealth of Nations